Ganesh Ganjhu was the member of Jharkhand Legislative Assembly from Simaria. In the 2014 general election, he was elected as MLA of Simaria as Jharkhand Vikas Morcha (Prajatantrik) candidate. In February 2015, he switched sides and joined the Bharatiya Janata Party with other five MLA's including Randhir Kumar Singh, Amar Kumar Bauri, Janki Prasad Yadav, Alok Kumar Chourasia and Navin Jaiswal from JVM(P).

Early life and family
Ganesh Ganjhu was born in Lutto village of Chatra district. He is son of Panchu Ganjhu. His brother Brajesh Ganjhu is supremo of banned Maoist organisation Tritiya Prastuti Committee(TPC).

Career
He is an agriculturist and a social worker. In 2009 he contested election in the ticket of Jharkhand Vikas Morcha (Prajatantrik), but lost. Then he joined Bharatiya Janata Party but could not get ticket to contest election. Then again in 2014, he joined JVM, contested election from Simaria and won. Then again in 2015, he switched to BJP.

References 

Living people
Bharatiya Janata Party politicians from Jharkhand
Jharkhand MLAs 2014–2019
Year of birth missing (living people)
Nagpuria people